The Estate of Michael Jackson is a legal entity established following the death of American singer Michael Jackson for the purpose of administering the property of Jackson, and overseeing the latter's posthumous income. The last will of Jackson was filed by an attorney John Branca at the Los Angeles County courthouse on July 1, 2009. Signed July 7, 2002, it names Branca and accountant John McClain as executors; they were confirmed as such by a Los Angeles judge on July 6, 2009. All assets are given to the (pre-existing) Michael Jackson Family Trust (amended March 22, 2002), the details of which have not been made public. The Associated Press reports that, in 2007, Jackson had a net worth of $236.6 million: $567.6 million in assets, which included Neverland Ranch and his 50% share of Sony/ATV Music Publishing' catalogue, and debts of $331 million. The guardianship of his three children is given to his mother, Katherine, or if she is unable or unwilling, to singer Diana Ross. Jackson's will allocates 20% of his fortune as well as 20% of money made after death to unspecified charities.

In 2012, in an attempt to end a family dispute, Jackson's brother Jermaine retracted his signature on a public letter criticizing executors of Jackson's estate and his mother's advisers over the legitimacy of his brother's will. T.J. Jackson, son of Tito Jackson, was given co-guardianship of Michael Jackson's children after false reports of Katherine Jackson going missing. Media reports suggested that the settlement of Jackson's estate could last many years. The value of Sony/ATV Music Publishing is estimated by Ryan Schinman, chief of Platinum Rye, to be US$1.5 billion. Shinman's estimate makes Jackson's share of Sony/ATV worth $750 million, from which Jackson would have had an annual income of $80 million. In September 2016, a deal was finalized for Sony's acquisition of Jackson's share of Sony/ATV from the Jackson estate for $750 million.

In 2016, Jackson's estate earned $825million, the highest yearly amount for a celebrity ever recorded by Forbes. In July 2018, Sony/ATV bought out the Jackson estate's 10% stake in EMI for $287.5 million.

Earnings
In 2016, Forbes estimated annual gross earnings by the Jackson Estate at $825million, the largest ever recorded for a celebrity, mostly due to the sale of the Sony/ATV catalog. In 2018, the figure was $400million. It was the eighth year since his death that Jackson's annual earnings were reported to be over $100million, thus bringing Jackson's postmortem total to $2.4billion. In 2020, Forbes recognized Jackson as the top-earning dead celebrity each year since his death except 2012.

Taxation of estate
The estate administrators and the IRS estimated portions of the estate differently.  The estate argued that its total value was $5.1 million, while the IRS initially estimated the estate's value at more than $500 million and then reduced it to $481.9 million. The IRS also proposed "an additional $197 million in penalties, including a gross valuation misstatement penalty." A major part of the dispute related to the value of Jackson's likeness; the estate claimed a value of just over $2,000; while the IRS initially valued it at over $434 million. Other disputes centered on the value of Jackson's interest in a trust that owns some songs of his and the Beatles; the value of Jackson's share of the Jackson 5 master recordings rights; and the values of various stocks, bonds, and  cars owned by Jackson. 

In 2013, the estate filed a U.S. Tax Court petition claiming that the IRS overestimated the value of the estate's assets. In 2021, the Tax Court issued a ruling in favor of the estate, ruling that the estate's total combined value of the estate was $111.5 million and that the value of Jackson's name and likeness was $4 million (not the $61 million estimated by the IRS's outside expert witness).

References

Michael Jackson
Inheritance